Mount Wise is a historic estate situated within the historic parish and manor of Devonport and situated about one mile west of the historic centre of the city of Plymouth, Devon. It occupies "a striking waterfront location" The new buildings were planned to have a "Georgian-inspired feel" with Admiralty House retained "as the figurehead of the scheme". Phase one ended in 2012, but sales of the new properties were slow due to the continued effects of the 2008 global recession.

The second phase of the development was due for completion in September 2015. Mount Wise House has been turned into offices, not the hotel as planned in phase one.

Sources

Pole, Sir William (d.1635), Collections Towards a Description of the County of Devon, Sir John-William de la Pole (ed.), London, 1791, p. 332, Stoke Damerell
Risdon, Tristram (d.1640), Survey of Devon, 1811 edition, London, 1811, with 1810 Additions, pp. 207–8, Stoke

References

Plymouth, Devon
Historic estates in Devon